Jeffrey Heaton (born 13 October 1943) is an English former professional rugby league footballer who played in the 1960s and 1970s who became a St Helens R.F.C. Hall of Fame inductee.

Background
Jeff Heaton was born in St. Helens, Lancashire, England.

Playing career

World Club Challenge Final appearances
Jeff Heaton was an interchange/substitute in St. Helens 2-25 defeat by the 1975 NSWRFL season premiers, Eastern Suburbs Roosters in the unofficial 1976 World Club Challenge at Sydney Cricket Ground on Tuesday 29 June 1976.

Challenge Cup Final appearances
Jeff Heaton played  in St. Helens' 16-13 victory over Leeds in the 1972 Challenge Cup Final during the 1971-72 season at Wembley Stadium, London on Saturday 13 May 1972, and played , and scored a try in the 20-5 victory over Widnes in the 1976 Challenge Cup Final during the 1975–76 season at Wembley Stadium, London on Saturday 8 May 1976.

County Cup Final appearances
Jeff Heaton played  in St. Helens' 7-4 victory over Swinton in the 1962 Lancashire County Cup Final during the 1962–63 season at Central Park, Wigan on Saturday 27 October 1962, and was an unused interchange/substitute in the 4-7 defeat by Leigh in the 1970 Lancashire County Cup Final during the 1970–71 season at Station Road, Swinton on Saturday 28 November 1970.

BBC2 Floodlit Trophy Final appearances
Jeff Heaton played  in St. Helens' 5-9 defeat by Leeds in the 1970 BBC2 Floodlit Trophy Final during the 1970-71 season at Headingley Rugby Stadium, Leeds on Tuesday 15 December 1970, played  in the 8-2 victory over Rochdale Hornets in the 1971 BBC2 Floodlit Trophy Final during the 1971-72 season at Headingley Rugby Stadium, Leeds on Tuesday 14 December 1971, and played , and scored a drop goal in the 22-2 victory over Dewsbury in the 1975 BBC2 Floodlit Trophy Final during the 1975-76 season at Knowsley Road, St. Helens on Tuesday 16 December 1975.

References

External links
Profile (1962 to '63) at saints.org.uk
Profile (1969 to '76) at saints.org.uk
Talent galore for Hornets

1943 births
Living people
English rugby league players
Liverpool City (rugby league) players
Rochdale Hornets players
Rugby league halfbacks
Rugby league players from St Helens, Merseyside
St Helens R.F.C. players